The siege of Barcelona took place between July 1651 and October 1652 during the Reapers' War when a large Spanish army descended on Barcelona and besieged the garrison made up of Catalans and French troops under Philippe de La Mothe-Houdancourt.

The fifteen-month siege eventually ended with a Spanish victory, and the effective defeat of the Catalan Revolt which had lasted since 1640, being the Principality of Catalonia reincorporated into the Monarchy of Spain. Although French troops remained in parts of Catalonia for another seven years, no serious fighting took place, and in 1659 the Treaty of the Pyrenees was signed bringing a formal end to the conflict.

References 

Military history of Barcelona
Barcelona
1651 in Spain
1652 in Spain
Barcelona 1651
Barcelona 1651
17th century in Barcelona
France–Spain military relations
Barcelona
Barcelona